Niendorf is one of 105 quarters of Hamburg, Germany in the Eimsbüttel borough. In 2020 the population was 40,906.

Geography
According to the statistical office of Hamburg and Schleswig-Holstein, the quarter has a total area of 12.7 km² .

Demographics
In 2006 in the quarter Niendorf were living 39,690 people. 15.2% were children under the age of 18, and 24.8% were 65 years of age or older. 6.9% were immigrants. 1,140 people were registered as unemployed.

In 1999 there were 20,092 households and 40.5% of all households were made up of individuals.

Education
There were 5 elementary schools and 4 secondary schools in Niendorf, including the Gymnasium Ohmoor. The public secondary school Gymnasium Ohmoor participates in the U.S. Congress - Bundestag Youth Exchange Program. The exchange program provides 250 full scholarships for American high school students, to let them "gain real world views of current affairs and German social, political and economic life." (Quoted official website http://www.usagermanyscholarship.org/). Other secondary schools include the Gymnasium Bondenwald, the Gesamtschule Niendorf and the Haupt- und Realschule Ohmoor.

Infrastructure

Health systems
In 2006 71 physicians in private practice and 10 pharmacies were counted.

Transportation
Public transport is provided by the Hamburger Verkehrsverbund with several stations of the underground railway and bus lines. The Niendorf Nord railway station is the terminus of the line U2.

The Bundesstrasse 447 pass the quarter connecting the Bundesstrasse 5 with the Bundesautobahn 7. According to the Department of Motor Vehicles (Kraftfahrt-Bundesamt), in Niendorf were 18,046 private cars registered (454 cars/1000 people).

Notes

References
 Statistisches Amt für Hamburg und Schleswig-Holstein, official website

External links

Gymnasium Ohmoor official website 
Tibarg official website  

Quarters of Hamburg
Eimsbüttel